Richard Crealy  (born 18 September 1944) is an Australian former tennis player most notable for reaching the final of the Australian Open in 1970, being a member of the 1970 Australian Davis Cup Team, and winning three Grand Slam titles in doubles.

Tennis career
Crealy was born in Sydney in 1944. In 1968 he achieved his first Grand Slam title at the Australian Open with his fellow countryman and team mate Allan Stone in doubles. He also won the mixed doubles with Billie Jean King.

Crealy won the Men's Doubles at the 1974 French Open with Onny Parun over Stan Smith and Bob Lutz. In 1970, Crealy had his most successful season, reaching No. 5 on the Grand Prix rankings. In this year, he reached the singles final at the Australian Open, where he lost to American player Arthur Ashe, as well as the quarter-finals of the French Open. He also won the Swedish Open in Båstad and represented Australia in the Davis Cup with a 4–2 singles record and 2–0 doubles record. In 1974, he won another Grand Slam Title in doubles, combining with New Zealander Onny Parun in the French Open.

Crealy retired from the ATP Tour in 1978, but continued having success for many years on the Veteran's Tour, playing in many of the "Legends" tournaments at the Australian Open. He also still plays Pro-Ams, often supporting The Starlight Foundation in its annual tournament in Sydney.

Dick Crealy is a Life Member of the Australian Davis Cup Foundation.

1969 US Open
There is some confusion over the 1969 US Open Championship title, which is held by Crealy and Allan Stone conjointly with Ken Rosewall and Fred Stolle.

The era of Open Tennis commenced in 1968, and at that time Boston was the home of the US National Doubles championship. However, the agents of some contract professionals demanded guaranteed prize money which could not be covered by the tournament. Accordingly, contract professionals boycotted the tournament, with many playing instead at Forest Hills, which was won by Rosewall and Stolle. Crealy and Stone won the Doubles in Boston in 1969 as professionals, defeating Charlie Pasarell and Bill Bowrey.

In 1971, the USTA and Association of Tennis Professionals decided to combine the winners of both tournaments to make the Grand Slam tournament. This was not an issue for the winners of 1968 as both tournaments were won by Smith and Lutz. Crealy and Stone were asked if they would agree to share the 1969 title with Rosewall and Stolle - they readily agreed, especially as the latter were two of the great Australian players and because "tennis was played with much goodwill in those days."

Grand Slam finals

Singles (1 runner-up)

Doubles (2 titles)

Mixed Doubles (1 title)

Grand Slam tournament performance timeline

Singles

Note: The Australian Open was held twice in 1977, in January and December.

Open era finals

Singles (2 titles, 2 runner-ups)

Doubles (8 titles, 12 runner-ups)

References

External links
 
 
 
 

1944 births
Living people
Australian Championships (tennis) champions
Australian male tennis players
French Open champions
Tennis players from Sydney
Grand Slam (tennis) champions in mixed doubles
Grand Slam (tennis) champions in men's doubles
20th-century Australian people
21st-century Australian people